was a samurai member of the Minamoto clan, who fought in the Hōgen and Heiji Rebellions and in the Genpei War. He was the adopted son of Minamoto no Tameyoshi since age thirteen.

Overview 
Sasaki fought under Minamoto no Yoshitomo in the Hōgen Rebellion (1156), aiding in the siege of the Shirakawa palace. Three years later, he fought for the Minamoto again in the Heiji Rebellion, incurring the ire of the rival Taira clan.

By the time of the Genpei War, the all-out civil war between the Minamoto and the Taira, Hideyoshi had lost his hereditary estate in Ōmi Province as a result of the displeasure of the Taira. He set out to appeal to his uncle, Fujiwara no Hidehira, for aid, but stopped in Sagami province along his way. There, he attracted the interest of a daimyō named Shibuya Shigekuni; Hideyoshi married Shibuya's daughter, and became heir to that land. His sons would serve Minamoto no Yoritomo, the first Kamakura shōgun.

Family 
grandfather:Sasaki Tsunekata
father:Sasaki Tametoshi
Wives:
 Minamoto no Tameyoshi’s daughter
 Shibuya Shigekuni’s daughter
 Utsunomiya-dono
Children:
eldest son:Sasaki Sadatsuna (1142-1205) by Minamoto no Tameyoshi’s daughter
second son:Sasaki Tsunetaka (1142/1151-1221) by Utsunomiya-dono
third son:Sasaki Moritsuna (b.1151) by Minamoto no Tameyoshi’s daughter
fourth son:Sasaki Takatsuna by Minamoto no Tameyoshi’s daughter
fifth son:Sasaki Yoshikiyo by Shibuya Shigekuni’s daughter
sixth son:Yoshida Gonsyu
7th son:Nōkei

References 
Papinot, Edmond (1910). Historical and geographical dictionary of Japan. Tokyo: Librarie Sansaisha.
Sansom, George (1958). 'A History of Japan to 1334'. Stanford, California: Stanford University Press.

See also 
Sasaki clan
Rokkaku clan
Kyogoku clan

Daimyo
1112 births
1184 deaths